Ben Kingree III (September 7, 1934 – March 6, 2015) was an American politician and lawyer.

Born in Shelbyville, Tennessee, Kingree served in the United States Marine Corps. He then received his bachelor's and law degrees from Vanderbilt University. He practiced law in Shelbyville, Tennessee. Kingree served in the Tennessee House of Representatives from 1967 to 1969 and was a Democrat. In 1972, Kingree moved to Atlanta, Georgia and practiced law. He died in Hilton Head Island, South Carolina where he lived.

Notes

1934 births
2015 deaths
Politicians from Atlanta
People from Shelbyville, Tennessee
Military personnel from Tennessee
Vanderbilt University alumni
Vanderbilt University Law School alumni
Georgia (U.S. state) lawyers
Tennessee lawyers
Democratic Party members of the Tennessee House of Representatives
People from Hilton Head, South Carolina
20th-century American lawyers